Social selling is the process of developing relationships as part of the sales process. Today this often takes place via social networks such as LinkedIn, Twitter, Facebook, and Pinterest, but can take place either online or offline. Examples of social selling techniques include sharing relevant content, interacting directly with potential buyers and customers, personal branding, and social listening. Social Selling is gaining popularity in a variety of industries, though it is used primarily for B2B (business-to-business) selling or highly considered consumer purchases (e.g., financial advisory services, automotive, realty). C2C companies (often referred to as direct selling companies) have been using social selling techniques (i.e. relationship building) since far before the Internet existed. B2B and B2C companies are now adopting many of those techniques as they are translated to social media platforms.

While social selling is sometimes confused with social marketing, there are two key differences. First, social selling is focused on sales professionals, rather than marketing professionals. Second, social selling aims to cultivate one-on-one relationships, rather than broadcast one-to-many messages. social marketing is a powerhouse which can provide right info at right time, but potential consumer expects established relationship rather than just info, so a completely successful selling process requires both social selling and social marketing to act together.

Overview
The University of British Columbia first established the science of social selling during research. They found that where there are incidental similarities between a buyer and seller, it is more likely a purchase would take place. For example, if two people follow the same sports team, they are more likely to feel a connection. The use of social technology can be used to discover incidental similarities and thus creating a quicker bond with the potential client.

Whilst the University of British Columbia discovered the science, it was Nigel Edelshain who was first to put the science into practice and coined the term sales 2.0. The name came from the web 2.0 development in 2006. Edelshain suggested in an interview that he felt the biggest problem with selling was regarding the prospecting phase. The reason is many sales techniques during the 1990s and early 2000s often could only be put into practice once a salesman had contact or was in a meeting. Following the development of sales 2.0, the buzzword social selling emerged.

Social selling has become more popular since companies have looked to increase their return on investment of social media interaction. Sales teams within organizations frequently mine data from social media that may help them connect to customers in order to create a more genuine sales lead. The technique frequently focuses on approaching potential clients in a less direct way, meaning they don't interrupt their daily lives with cold calls and hard sells. Koka Sexton was interviewed and spoke about how salespeople can use social media to leverage their connections to gather insights and build relationships. Sexton stated that the art of social selling is said to speed up many sales processes, while also improving relationships.

Arguments for and against

Supporters advocate for social selling as a necessary and effective response to a changing selling environment. They argue that, while sales professionals still impact the path to purchase, they are no longer able to personally manage the buying process. These advocates cite a Corporate Executive Board (CEB) study that reports almost 60% of today's buying process is complete before the buyer reaches out to sales. To show effectiveness, supporters point to an Aberdeen Group study finding that social sellers outperform other sales professionals across a range of key performance indicators (KPIs).

The most common criticism is that "social selling" is an overhyped buzzword rather than a true sales methodology. Detractors argue that in-person meetings are still more effective than social networking for cultivating relationships, and that social networking should complement, not replace, traditional sales activity.

Components

Social prospecting involves monitoring and/or searching social networks for signs of customer interest, immediate buying intent, or qualified prospect status based on industry, role, geography, etc. For example, a financial advisor may monitor social media for major life events (e.g., birth of a child, change in employment status, retirement, death of a parent) that correlate to a need for investment advice. Similarly, B2B outbound sales professionals frequently search LinkedIn for individuals matching their target buyer profiles.

Personal branding is the use of social media to establish an individual's reputation and credibility. Typically this is done through the creation of compelling personal profiles that showcase a sales professional's expertise, credibility, and integrity. Personal branding also involves highlighting of personal information (e.g., education background, personal interests, religious affiliation, nonprofit activity) to find common ground with potential buyers and channel partners.

Employee advocacy is when sales professionals or other staff leverage their own social presence to share positive news, stories, and insights about their company with their networks. This includes sharing content, responding to questions, connecting with industry leaders, and using industry- and company-related hashtags. While some companies give employees the license to create and promote their own content, many companies establish guidelines, or even supply appropriate content to employees.

Social relationship management is the use of digital networks as channels for nurturing ongoing relationships with customers. Social relationship management – sometimes referred to as social CRM - is an extension of traditional relationship management that focuses on communication and feedback with customers vis-a-vis social media. Social Relationship Management tactics include listening and responding to customer feedback online, and re-posting user-generated content regarding company. Social Relationship Management emphasizes authentic and genuine connections, and directly engaging with stakeholders in online conversations.

Finding the right people is another fundamental pillar towards applying social selling. Due to the evolution of sales and marketing, the buying committee has shifted to having 6.8 people involved on average. Therefore, it becomes crucial to get to know those people to start influencing and building sustainable and long-term relationships with them.

Measurement

There are at least three distinct methods for measuring social selling and social selling effectiveness.

Social Selling Index (SSI) is a score created by LinkedIn to rank a members' use of LinkedIn as a social selling tool. The SSI is based on four criteria: Creating a professional brand, finding the right people, engaging with insights, and building strong relationships. Each criterion is assigned a value from 1-25, and the four numbers are totaled for an overall SSI score. Strengths of this method include its multi-dimensional methodology and relative clarity on the criteria used. The SSI is limited by its exclusive focus on LinkedIn (as opposed to other social networks), and its focus on activity (as opposed to impact or outcomes). However, LinkedIn asserts that high SSI professionals generate 45% more opportunities per quarter.

Klout Score quantifies an individual's social influence by analyzing the social graph's response to content posted by the individual. Also based on a 1-100 ranking score, Klout differs from the Social Selling Index in two key ways. First, it looks across social networks for its measurement. Second, it looks at impact (rather than activity) by analyzing social gestures such as following, retweeting, liking, favoriting, etc. Critics of the Klout Score claim that social gestures (following, liking, and favoriting, etc.) are superficial actions, and insufficiently meaningful to serve as accurate or reliable indicators of true influence. Also, the application of Klout score to a sales context is merely indirect, given that Klout is designed to be an influence metric rather than a sales metric per se.

Revenue Attribution is a technique employed by some sales organizations (e.g., ADP, CBIZ, Prudential) to measure social selling effectiveness. These companies explicitly identify new deals sourced or influenced by social, using the value of those deals to quantify the success of social selling. The revenue attribution method has the benefit of linking social selling to specific deals won. However, revenue attribution tends to be more complex to track, requiring manual data capture and/or customization to Customer Relationship Management systems where sales data is captured and analyzed.

In an enterprise
Enterprises are becoming increasingly involved in implementing social selling at the enterprise level. According to IBM, the company that integrates social media into their business model, is one that embraces and cultivates a spirit of collaboration and community throughout its organization—both internally and externally. IBM piloted a social selling program in 2012 that is widely regarded as one of the most successful, early examples of effective social selling at the enterprise level. According to the Social Selling Maturity Model, a prevalent theory on social selling, there are a variety of ways enterprises engage social. These stages include allowing employees to use social media at will, enacting general policies, training employees on effective use, and deploying software designed to improve the social selling process.

Enabling social selling within enterprise is a journey and very few enterprises have succeeded. The success of the social- centered selling depends on adoption of program for which an organization needs to follow a structured approach. Enterprise social selling framework defines the 3 phases of social selling program which if followed properly can assure the maximum out of the social selling program.  The following defines the 3 phases of the Enterprise social selling framework.

PreLaunch Phase: The prelaunch phase includes all the planning activities related to launch the program which includes defining the Key performance indicators (KPIs) of the program, understanding and bench marking the digital presence of audience, creating the buzz around the program to excite the participants, enabling the CRM system to track the leads generated from social selling which will help measure the ROI of the program. It also includes communicating benefits of program to participants.

Execution Phase: The execution phase includes on-boarding the participants to digital platforms by enabling creation of their profiles, coaching the participants on publishing content, identifying prospect, and finally approaching / engaging with prospects.

Post Launch Phase: The post-launch phase includes the activities to support the participants adopt the program by provisioning the relevant content, queries resolution. This phase also includes tracking the benefits of the program by reporting the leads generated from social selling, evaluating the Key performance indicators (KPIs) defined in the prelaunch phase and communicating these benefits to the management.

Salesforce.com stated in an article that social selling could work in parallel with traditional sales techniques in order to further increase conversions. The Salesforce example looked at senior sales managers and their strategic approach to selling. If a sales director understands that he wins business when there is a significant change, such as a sudden expansion or contraction, he will do everything in order to monitor companies in this position.

Social selling can be used in this scenario. A salesman can use saved searches to look for trigger phrases in social media, such as Twitter. He can also comment on industry blogs, and keep an eye on LinkedIn for new job openings and breaking news. This information collectively helps the salesman understand when a sales opportunity is available. This could be seen as an initial step before selling takes place, as the salesman will already be involved in the conversation, ensuring the lead isn't cold.

See also
 Multi-level Marketing
Social CRM

References

Further reading
 

Sales
Business terms